Aaron Barber Memorial Building, also known as Avon Free Library, is a historic library building located at the village of Avon in Livingston County, New York.  It is a rectangular five- by three-bay brick one story brick building with a hipped roof.  It was built in 1928 in the Colonial Revival style.

It was listed on the National Register of Historic Places in 2008.

References

External links
Avon Free Library blog

Library buildings completed in 1928
Libraries on the National Register of Historic Places in New York (state)
Colonial Revival architecture in New York (state)
Buildings and structures in Livingston County, New York
1928 establishments in New York (state)
National Register of Historic Places in Livingston County, New York